Sibylle of Saxe-Lauenburg (Franziska Sibylle Auguste; 21 January 1675 – 10 July 1733) was Margravine of Baden-Baden. Born a Duchess of Saxe-Lauenburg, she was the wife of Louis William, Margrave of Baden-Baden, a famous Imperial general who was known as the Türkenlouis. She acted as consort of the ruler of Baden-Baden (1690–1707) and then regent of Baden-Baden (1707–1727) for her son Louis George.

Biography

Early life
Franziska Sibylle Augusta was born in 1675 at the Schloss Ratzeburg the second daughter of Julius Francis, Duke of Saxe-Lauenburg and his wife Countess Palatine Maria Hedwig Augusta of Sulzbach.

In 1676 the family moved to Schlackenwerth in Bohemia where she and her sister spent their youth. Her older sister Anna Maria Franziska of Saxe-Lauenburg was the future Grand Duchess of Tuscany as the wife of Gian Gastone de' Medici future Grand Duke of Tuscany. When their mother died in 1681, their education was entrusted to Countess Eva Polyxena of Werschowitz (d. 1699). Their education was conducted in the art of courtly etiquette in conversation, painting and music, deemed the traditional education for a female in the era. She was also taught by her grand father Christian Augustus, Count Palatine of Sulzbach.

As the two sisters were the only surviving children of the duke and duchess of Saxe-Lauenburg, they were desirable candidates for marriage due to their inheritance which they would be entitled to at their father's death in 1689.

At her father's death, her sister would become the duchess of Saxe-Lauenburg in her own right and would pass the duchy to her children. Their father was apparently poisoned according to court gossip, the culprit allegedly Countess Werschowitz.

With his death, the Lauenburg line of the House of Ascania was extinct in the male line. However, female succession was possible by the Saxe-Lauenburgian laws. So the legal female heir to the throne, Duchess Anna Maria Franziska, and her sister Sibylle of Saxe-Lauenburg fought for the succession of the former, the elder of them. Also Julius Francis' cousin, Eleonore Charlotte of Saxe-Lauenburg-Franzhagen, claimed the succession. Their weakness was abused by Duke George William of the neighbouring Brunswick-Lunenburgian Principality of Lunenburg-Celle, who invaded Saxe-Lauenburg with his troops, thus inhibiting Anna Maria's ascension as Duchess regnant.

Also other monarchies claimed the succession, evoking a conflict further involving the neighbouring duchies of Mecklenburg-Schwerin and of Danish Holstein, as well as the five Ascanian-ruled Principalities of Anhalt, the Electorate of Saxony, which had succeeded the Saxe-Wittenbergian Ascanians in 1422, Sweden and Brandenburg. The conflict was finally settled on 9 October 1693 (Hamburger Vergleich), definitely ousting the dispossessed Anna Maria and her sister. Both sisters never gave up the claim.

Emperor Leopold I rejected Celle's succession and thus retained the Saxe-Lauenburgian exclave of Hadeln, which was out of Celle's reach, in his custody. Only in 1728 his son Emperor Charles VI enfeoffed George II Augustus with Saxe-Lauenburg, finally legitimising the de facto takeover by his grandfather in 1689 and 1693. In 1731 George II Augustus also gained Hadeln from imperial custody.

Marriage

Sibylle was due to marry Prince Eugene of Savoy but preferred the other candidate, the older and impoverished Margrave of Baden-Baden who had lost practically everything due to the war with France.

Sibylle was engaged to Louis William, Margrave of Baden-Baden, some 20 years older than she and childless. He was also known as "Turkish Louis" (Türkenlouis) due to his famous exploits against the Ottomans and his efforts against Louis XIV in the field and as part of the Imperial Army.

As a result, Louis William traveled to meet his young bride in Bohemia.

Margravine of Baden-Baden

He arrived in Bohemia on 10 January 1690. The couple were officially betrothed on 14 January and the actual marriage occurred on 27 March 1690, Sibylle aged 15. The couple were supposed to be married at Schloss Raudnitz, the main residence of the Margrave, but that had been destroyed by the French. As a result, the newlyweds stayed in Ostrov. Although a reigning prince, Louis of Baden-Baden was a retired general, twenty years older than Sibylle Auguste.

The emperor had deemed that her sister marry Prince Eugene of Savoy again due to his service in the name of the emperor. But she married Philipp Wilhelm of the Palatinate, son of Philip William, Elector Palatine and Elisabeth Amalie of Hesse-Darmstadt. When Philipp Wilhelm died in 1693, she married Gian Gastone de' Medici, Grand Prince of Tuscany and son of Cosimo III de' Medici, Grand Duke of Tuscany and Marguerite Louise d'Orléans (first cousin of Louis XIV).

Shortly after his marriage to Sibylle, Margrave Louis William, however, was again engaged in the war against the Ottomans. The battle of Slankamen in 1691 was his greatest triumph.

The exchange of letters between the young Sibylle and her husband have since been lost, but Sibylle had a close relationship with her grandfather, the Christian August, Count Palatine of Sulzbach; from these letters it is obvious that Christian August adored his youngest granddaughter.

In the early years of the marriage, Sibylle was often separated from her husband and had plenty of time to cultivate her personal interests. But soon she began to worry about the management of their property, an experience from which they drew much benefit later.

Issue

The couple had nine children in all but were destined to see most of them die in childhood. With regards to her children, Sibylle was nicknamed the unlucky: her first pregnancy ended in miscarriage; the first child lived for four months, the second for three years, the third for five years, the fourth for one year, the fifth for six years. Of the couple's nine children, only three reached the tenth year of life - two sons and a daughter. Of the two sons, one was childless and the other had only one daughter, who in turn was childless. Sibylle's only surviving progeny are through her daughter Auguste, who married Louis d'Orléans, grandson of Louis XIV. Through Auguste, Sibylle was the great-grandmother of Louis Philippe I, King of the French. Auguste died in childbirth at age 21.

Leopold William (Günsburg, 28 November 1694 – Günsburg, March 1695), Hereditary Prince of Baden-Baden (according to other sources he lived 28 November 1695 – 19 May 1696), died in infancy
Charlotte (Günsburg, 7 August 1696 – Günsburg?, 16 January 1700), died in childhood
Charles Joseph (Augsburg, 30 September 1697 – Schlackenwerth, 9 March 1703), Hereditary Prince of Baden-Baden, died in childhood
Wilhelmine (Schlackenwerth, 14 August 1700 – Schlackenwerth, 16 May 1702), died in childhood.
Louise (Nürnberg, 8/9 May 1701 – 23 September 1707), died in childhood
Louis George Simpert (Ettlingen, 7 June 1702 – Rastatt, 22 October 1761), Margrave of Baden-Baden, married first Maria Anna of Schwarzenberg, later Maria Anna of Bavaria
William George Simpert (Aschaffenburg, 5 September 1703 – Baden-Baden, 16 February 1709), died in childhood
Auguste Marie Johanna (Aschaffenburg, 10 November 1704 – Paris, 8 August 1726), married Louis d'Orléans, Duke of Orléans, and had issue one surviving son. She was an ancestor of Louis Philippe I, King of France.
Augustus George Simpert (Rastatt, 14 January 1706 – Rastatt, 21 October 1771), Margrave of Baden-Baden, married Marie Victoire d'Arenberg

When her second son Charles Joseph, Hereditary Prince of Baden-Baden, died in 1703, she made a first pilgrimage to Maria Einsiedeln; it was followed by another seven pilgrimages.

Regent

Her husband Louis William, died in January 1707 aged 51 of a war injury. He was succeeded by their eldest surviving son Louis George who had been Hereditary Prince of Baden-Baden since his birth in 1702.

Louis George was aged five and as such, Sibylle was created the Regent of Baden-Baden in the name of her son. Sibylle has been credited with the reconstruction of Baden-Baden, a state which had been ravaged greatly by the French during their various wars prior to Louis George's birth. Sibylle held a tight rein on the states finances and by the time of Louis George's majority in 1727, the state was once again flourishing and she had considerably augmented his own personal fortune. Whenever she could, she made pilgrimages to the next secular advisors, such as Leopold, Duke of Lorraine and the Elector Johann Wilhelm, Elector Palatine. She also sought spiritual support too.

During her regency, she helped reconstruct as well as create many new splendid buildings including palaces, villa's as well as places of worship.

With the Treaty of Rastatt in 1714, she built the Einsiedeln Chapel in Rastatt in gratitude. Louis George reached his majority on 22 October 1727 at the age of 25. Sibylle thus retired from state administration to Ettlingen Palace in Ettlingen. In her dowager years, she also carried out various improvements which were finished in the year of her death in 1733.

As her only daughter was still unmarried in 1723, it was Siyblle tried to find a suitable candidate for her only daughter known as Johanna. Her mother proposed two candidates; Prince Alexander Ferdinand of Thurn and Taxis, son and heir of Anselm Franz of Thurn and Taxis, a wealthy German noble of the powerful Thurn und Taxis family and the Postmaster General of the Holy Roman Empire. The second was a French nobleman Louis d'Orléans, Duke of Orléans. Her mother preferred the French match as it would strengthen ties with a powerful neighbour who prior to Johanna's birth, had ravaged Baden-Baden. Johanna however preferred the German match due to her roots.

Johanna, however gave into her mother and agreed to the match with Louis d'Orléans and there was a proxy ceremony held at the Schloss Rastatt before she was married on 13 July 1724 Louis d'Orléans, the grandson of Louis XIV of France. Chosen for, among other reasons, her family's Catholic beliefs, she brought a comparatively small dowry of 80,000 livres to the House of Orléans.

Later years

Having retired, she made various pilgrimages and under the influence of the Cardinal Damian Hugo Philipp von Schönborn, she led a very religious life and visited various monasteries.

Sibylle, born a Duchess of Saxe-Lauenburg, Margravine of Baden-Baden and Regent of Baden-Baden died at the Schloss Ettlingen on 10 July 1733 at the age of 58. As instructed in her will she was buried at the Schloss Rastatt with little pomp.

Architectural legacy

Siyblle had an active interest in architecture as well as property management. While living in Ostrov with her husband in the first years of their marriage, the two carried out improvements to the Weißes Schloss (White Palace). Their chosen architect was Johann Michael Sock.

Sibylle's most significant legacy was Schloss Rastatt, which became the main residence of the rulers of Baden-Baden when Rastatt got promoted to city status in 1700. The residence in Rastatt is the oldest baroque residence in the German Upper Rhine area and was built according to the example of the French Palace of Versailles.

She also carried out various other projects:

1707 : Renovations begin at the Schloss Rastatt;
1710 : Construction on the Schloss Favorite begins;
1713 : Construction on the Valentin Church, Karlsruhe begins;
1714 : Reconstruction in Rastatt begins;
1715 : Construction on the Einsiedeln Chapel begins;
1717 : Construction on the Home Office, Offenburg begins;
1717 : Construction on the Fremersberg hunting lodge begins;
1718 : Hermitage Museum in the Park of Schloss Favorite is built;
1719 : Holy Cross Church (Castle Church) in Rastatt is built;
1721 : Loretokapelle is built;
1721 : Extension of the Jagdschloss Scheibenhardt in Bulach;
1722 : Pagodenburg is built in the gardens of Rastatt;
1723 : Exentsions on the Schloss Bruchsal
1724 : Hermitage in Waghäusel is built;
1724 : Redesigning of the Schloss Kislau;
1724 : Various projects at Scheibenhardt;
1728 : Expansion  of Ettlingen Palace;
1731 : Chapel in Ettlingen Palace;
1730 : Reconstruction of the nave of the church of St. Martin in Ettlingen.

Ancestry

References

Sources
 Otto Flake: Türkenlouis. Gemälde einer Zeit. 2. Auflage. Fischer, Frankfurt am Main 1988, 
 Saskia Esser: Leben und Werk der Markgräfin Franziska Sibylla Augusta. Ausstellungskatalog, Stadt Rastatt, Rastatt 1983, 
 Clemens Jöckle: Maria-Einsiedeln-Kapelle Rastatt. Schnell & Steiner, Regensburg 1999, 
 Hans-Georg Kaack: Markgräfin Sibylla Augusta. Die große badische Fürstin der. Barockzeit. Stadler, Konstanz 1983, 
 Anna Maria Renner: Sybilla Augusta. Markgräfin von Baden. Die Geschichte eines denkwürdigen Lebens. 4. Auflage. Müller, Karlsruhe 1981, 
 Gerlinde Vetter: Zwischen Glanz und Frömmigkeit. Der Hof der badischen Markgräfin Sibylla Augusta. Katz, Gernsbach 2006, 
 Rudolf Sillib: Schloß Favorite und die Eremitagen der Markgräfin Franziska Sibylla Augusta von Baden-Baden. Neujahrsblätter der Badischen Historischen Kommission, Neue Folge 17. Carl Winters Universitätsbuchhandlung, Heidelberg 1914.

 

  

1675 births
1733 deaths
People from Ratzeburg
Duchesses of Saxe-Lauenburg
German princesses
House of Ascania
17th-century German people
18th-century German people
Regents of Germany
Margravines of Baden-Baden
House of Zähringen
18th-century women rulers
Daughters of monarchs